is an railway station in Higashiyodogawa-ku, Osaka, Osaka Prefecture, Japan, and operated by West Japan Railway Company (JR West). The station was opened on 16 March 2019.

Lines
JR-Awaji Station served by the Osaka Higashi Line, was completed on 16 March 2019.

Layout
The station has two side platforms, each capable of accommodating eight-car trains.

See also
 Awaji Station on the Hankyu Railway nearby
 List of railway stations in Japan

References

External links
 Osaka Soto-kanjo Railway website 

Higashiyodogawa-ku, Osaka
Railway stations in Osaka
Stations of West Japan Railway Company
Railway stations in Japan opened in 2019